Vellalore is a panchayat town in Coimbatore district in the Indian state of Tamil Nadu. It is a southern suburb of the city. It is at 12 km east of Townhall, the centre of the city Coimbatore. It is situated on the southern bank of  Noyyal river.

History
Vellalore or Vellalur, the ancient trade centre is located in the southern bank of the river Noyyal. It is ~60 km from Kodumanal. It is referred in the inscriptions of the Kongu chola as "Vellalur". However, in Cholan poorvapattayam mentioned as 'Velir' meaning cheif of the clan was the ruler of this area. That might be one of the reason it is known after the name of the chief as 'vellalur'. Black and red ware, Russed coated ware, Red slipped ware and Black ware sherds were collected along with the broken pieces of dishes, vases and parts of urn pieces were recovered here. Many hoards of Roman coins were discovered during the British period. In the year 1842 five hundred and twenty two coins, in 1891, five hundred and forty seven coins were collected. These gold and silver coins belongs in between 1st Century BCE to 4th centry CE. In addition, Roman ornaments were also found. Vellalore had trade links with the Roman empire since 100 BC. Vellalore was one of the prominent towns in the era of Early Cholas. Karikala Chola built the Karivaradaraja perumal temple in 1 AD. During the medieval period Siva and Vishnu temples were constructed by the Chera and Kongu cholas. After the Kongu cholas, Vellalore slowley lost its historical importance.

Geography
Vellalore has an average elevation of 411 m (1,348 ft). Vellalore is situated on the southern bank of Noyyal River. It shares its border with Podanur, Singanallur, Chettipalayam, Eachanari and Nanjundapuram.

Vellalore Lake
Vellalore Lake is a lake in Coimbatore, Tamil Nadu. It is one of the lakes in the Noyyal river irrigation network. The lake is spread over an area of 90 acres.

Demographics
 India census, Vellalore had a population of 17,294. Males constitute 50% of the population and females 50%. Vellalore has an average literacy rate of 64%, which is higher than the national average of 59.5%; male literacy is 70%, and female literacy is 59%. In Vellalore, 8% of the population is under 6 years of age.

Administration
 Vellalore is administered by a Town Panchayat.
 It was planned to include Vellalore in the Coimbatore corporation in 2011, but this plan was dropped later.
 Vellalore is a part of Kinathukadavu (state assembly constituency) and Pollachi (Lok Sabha constituency).

Religion

Hinduism
Theneeswarar Temple

Coimbatore Integrated Bus Terminus
An Integrated bus terminus for Coimbatore was announced by the Chief Minister of Tamil Nadu at Vellalore at a cost of 178 Crore Rupee and is under construction in Anbu Nagar near to the Coimbatore Ring Road.

References

Neighbourhoods in Coimbatore